Calea UK is a supplier of parenteral nutrition  based in Runcorn, part of  Fresenius Kabi.

In July 2019 the Medicines and Healthcare products Regulatory Agency imposed restrictions on the company following an inspection which it said had revealed contamination risks and that its production processes did not meet required standards. The resulting disruption of supplies to patients who rely on total parenteral nutrition was declared a national emergency by NHS England.  Intravenous feed bags were imported from Norway and Germany for 511 patients.  These bags are only a temporary expedient because they do not provide vital nutrients and electrolytes, such as potassium.  Dozens of patients were admitted to hospital as a result.

The actions of the regulator were denounced as reprehensible by clinical members of the British Association for Parenteral and Enteral Nutrition, who said there wasn’t any apparent forward planning or mitigation plan around what would happen when they were closed down.

Calea said it “was directed by the MHRA to make an immediate change to the process by which we add trace elements and vitamins to our parenteral nutrition bags, and we complied with the instruction. As a result, the time taken to produce bags has increased considerably and this has, unfortunately, affected the supply to patients. The MHRA stated there was no evidence to indicate that any of the Calea products manufactured and supplied to patients were contaminated. Approximately 2.8 million products were aseptically manufactured by Calea for patients and hospitals in the intervening 2015-2019 period.” 

The agency said they had found bacterial contamination in the production area and that the manufacturing processes in Runcorn did not meet guidelines. 

Patients complained that they were left starving when supplies did not arrive, and that they were given no information. There were about 130 patients affected in Wales. The substituted supplies made some of them very ill. About 2500 patients are receiving intravenous nutrition and fluids in the UK at any one time. It is expected that it will be some time before regular supplies are resumed.  The industrial capacity is very small. The action of the agency has been widely condemned by clinicians.

References

Companies based in Cheshire
Health care companies of the United Kingdom
Intravenous fluids